The 1999 Iraqi Perseverance Cup was the 4th edition of the Iraqi Super Cup. The match was contested between Baghdad rivals Al-Zawraa and Al-Talaba at Al-Shaab Stadium in Baghdad. It was played on 15 September 1999 as a curtain-raiser to the 1999–2000 season. Al-Zawraa retained their title, winning 5–4 on penalties after a 2–2 draw.

Match

Details

References

External links
 Iraq Football Association

Football competitions in Iraq
1999–2000 in Iraqi football
Iraqi Super Cup